Roberto Matute Puras (born 26 August 1972) is a Spanish retired professional footballer who played as a forward.

Club career
Born in San Asensio, La Rioja, Matute made his professional debut with local club CD Logroñés, but could never impose in its first team: after totalling just seven La Liga matches in his first two years he appeared relatively more, going on to experience one promotion and relegation. His only goals in the top flight came in the 1994–95 campaign, against Albacete Balompié (1–1 home draw) and RCD Español (same result and venue).

Aged 24, Matute moved to neighbouring Portugal where he would spend the next three seasons, with G.D. Chaves and C.F. Os Belenenses, helping the latter return to the country's Primeira Liga in 1998–99 with eight goals. In 1999 he signed with Dundee F.C. in the Scottish Premier League, but returned to his homeland after only two months – with one start and one goal against Hibernian to his credit– joining Segunda División B side Burgos CF.

Matute continued playing in the third tier until his retirement at the age of 32, with UDA Gramenet and CD Recreación (named Logroñés CF in 2005).

References

External links

1972 births
Living people
Spanish footballers
Footballers from La Rioja (Spain)
Association football forwards
La Liga players
Segunda División players
Segunda División B players
CD Logroñés footballers
Burgos CF footballers
UDA Gramenet footballers
Logroñés CF footballers
Primeira Liga players
Liga Portugal 2 players
G.D. Chaves players
C.F. Os Belenenses players
Scottish Premier League players
Dundee F.C. players
Spanish expatriate footballers
Expatriate footballers in Portugal
Expatriate footballers in Scotland
Spanish expatriate sportspeople in Portugal
Spanish expatriate sportspeople in Scotland